This is a list of cleft lip and palate organisations around the world.

Seitebogo Peta Cleft Palate Foundation

Canada
 Transforming Faces Worldwide
 AboutFace

China
 Smile Angel Foundation

India 

 Smile Train India

United Kingdom
 Smile Train UK
 Cleft Lip and Palate Association
 Facing the World
 Project Harar

United States
 American Cleft Palate-Craniofacial Association
 Smile Train
 Operation Smile
ReSurge International
 Shriners Hospitals for Children
 Smile Network International
 Thousand Smiles Foundation
 Alliance for Smiles
 Rotaplast International

References

Dental organizations
Cleft
Oral and maxillofacial surgery organizations